Chen Tianqiao; born 1973) is a Chinese businessman and philanthropist. His wealth is estimated at US$4 billion. Chen moved from Shanghai to Singapore in 2009 and then to the Bay Area, California in 2017. He co-founded the Tianqiao and Chrissy Chen Institute in 2016.

Early life and education 
Chen was born in 1973 in a city in the Zhejiang Province, China. With his father working as an engineer and his mother teaching middle school English, Chen and his younger brother Danian grew up near Shanghai. In 1993 He earned a bachelor's degree in economics from Fudan University.

Career
Chen joined the state-run property developer Shanghai Lujiazui Group in 1994, holding management positions in the public relations office and also secretary of the chairman. In 1998 he became vice director of the office of the president of Kinghing Trust & Investment. Chen resigned from this role in 1999.

He started Shanda Interactive Entertainment Limited as an online games company with his family in 1999. He became board president. Shanda Interactive became the first Chinese online games company listed in the U.S. on Nasdaq in May 2004. Shanda is known for creating and promoting a freemium model for online games subscription in China.

The company became the largest Internet company in China by market capitalization in 2004. In 2004 Chen was second on China's Hurun Review rich list.

China Central Television voted him their leading "Rising Business Star." He was put on the 100 Innovators Under 35 list put out by the MIT Technology Review.

Shanda Group went private in early 2012, with Chen, his wife, and his brother keeping a combined 57% stake.

Tianqiao Chen and his family sold all their stakes in Shanda Games in November 2014, after which Shanda Group refocused on investing.

With Chen remaining chairman and CEO, by early 2017 Shanda Group was the majority shareholder of Legg Mason, Lending Club,  and Community Health Systems. It also had property operations in China and North America and stakes in companies such as Sotheby's. Shanda sold its stakes in Sotheby's in 2017 and then it sold its stake Legg Mason later that year, and then Chen resigned as vice-chairman of the Legg Mason board. Chen has invested in the venture funds Propel(x) and Ubiquity Ventures.

Ranked on various rich lists, Chen personally had $4 billion in net value in 2017 and was ranked as the 93rd richest person in China, according to the Hurun Report.

In 2018, the Committee of 100 gave Chen an award for Lifetime Achievement as Tech Entrepreneur.

Boards 
Chen is chairman of the Shanda Group, and is also on the boards of various portfolio companies. Chen is married to Qianqian "Chrissy" Luo  who in 2022 joined the Board of Governors of the Huntington Library and Gardens  and the Board of Trustees of the California Academy of Sciences. She is also a member of the China Leadership Board at the 21st Century China Center at University of California, San Diego.

Philanthropy

Chen and his wife have donated money to medical programs, education, and disaster relief in China and Mongolia. Chen and his wife created the Tianqiao and Chrissy Chen Institute in 2016, and set aside US $1 billion to the non-profit to support fundamental brain research. The non-profit has funded and partnered with the Tianqiao and Chrissy Chen Institute for Neuroscience at Caltech, and the Zhou Liangu Foundation and Huashan Hospital in Shanghai. The couple was named Inside Philanthropy's 2017 Science Funders of the Year, and that same year Chen was named one of Forbes Asia’s Heroes of Philanthropy. According to Barron's, the Chens as of 2019 were dedicating much of their time to the institute, with a focus on "compiling data gathered from universities on post-doc programs into a white paper that should allow them to better understand the challenges postdocs face, including pressures to leave for industry." After the post-doctoral focus and a second documentary, Chen wanted the institute to "facilitate the integration of neuroscience, psychiatry, psychology, sociology, philosophy, and even religion" to study "who we are" as humans.

Personal life 
Chen and his wife Qianqian "Chrissy" Luo. moved from Shanghai to Singapore in 2009, then from Singapore to the Bay Area of California in late 2017. They are currently residents of Menlo Park, California. Chen bought in 2018 for $39 million a historic mansion built for Alice Gwynne Vanderbilt in 1881 on East 69th Street in the Upper East Side of Manhattan.

References

1973 births
Billionaires from Zhejiang
Living people
People from Xinchang County
Fudan University alumni
Shanda people
Businesspeople from Shaoxing
Chinese philanthropists
Chinese company founders